Aryeh Leib Yaffe (born 1876) was a Hebrew poet, journalist and editor of Haaretz newspaper.  
 
Leib Yaffe was born in Grodno, Belarus. He spent his university years in Germany. A life-long champion of the Zionist cause, he immigrated to Palestine in 1920, where he became chief editor of Haaretz.  He founded and served as director-general of Keren Hayesod. In 1924, he visited Pinsk to promote the Zionist cause and received a warm welcome from the Jewish community.

In 1942, he was sent on a mission to South America, and in December of that year he traveled to  United States as an emissary of the Zionist Movement.

On March 11, 1948, he and 12 others were killed by a car bomb in the courtyard of the Jewish Agency building in Jerusalem.

There are streets named after him in Jerusalem's Talpiot neighborhood, in Herzliya, and in Beersheba.

References

External links
The personal papers of Leib Yaffe are kept at the  Central Zionist Archives in Jerusalem
 photos of Yaffe in the YIVO collection

Zionists
Jews in Mandatory Palestine
Israeli newspaper editors
1948 deaths
Israeli terrorism victims
Terrorism deaths in Jerusalem
1876 births